The brown trapezoid snake (Smithophis bicolor) is a species of snake found in India (Assam, Meghalaya; Arunachal Pradesh (Deban, Namdapha - Changlang district)), North Myanmar (Burma), and China (West Yunnan). While formerly classified under the genus Rhabdops, a study published in 2019 found it to belong to the new genus Smithophis.

References

 Blyth, Edward. 1855 Notices and descriptions of various reptiles, new or little known [part 2]. Jour. Asiatic Soc. Bengal, Calcutta, 23 (3): 287-302 [1854]

Smithophis
Reptiles described in 1854
Taxa named by Edward Blyth
Reptiles of India
Reptiles of China